The 1976–77 New York Nets season was the tenth season for the franchise, and the first for the team in the NBA. It was also their last before moving back to New Jersey.

Roster

Regular season
In a special $6 million deal, the Nets sold Julius Erving, the ABA's leading scorer, to the Philadelphia 76ers for $3 million. The other $3 million went to Erving, by way of a new contract.

Season standings

Record vs. opponents

References

 New York Nets on Basketball Reference

New York Nets season
New Jersey Nets seasons
New York Nets
New York Nets
Sports in Hempstead, New York